József Kovács (3 March 1926 – 29 March 1987) was a Hungarian athlete who competed mainly in the 10,000 metres.

Born in Nyíregyháza, Szabolcs-Szatmár-Bereg he competed for Hungary in the 1956 Summer Olympics held in Melbourne, Australia in the 10,000 metres where he won the silver medal.

References
 

1926 births
1987 deaths
Hungarian male long-distance runners
Olympic silver medalists for Hungary
Athletes (track and field) at the 1952 Summer Olympics
Athletes (track and field) at the 1956 Summer Olympics
Athletes (track and field) at the 1960 Summer Olympics
Olympic athletes of Hungary
European Athletics Championships medalists
Medalists at the 1956 Summer Olympics
Olympic silver medalists in athletics (track and field)
People from Nyíregyháza
Sportspeople from Szabolcs-Szatmár-Bereg County
20th-century Hungarian people